The U.S. Junior Figure Skating Championships, often referred to by figure skaters as Junior Nationals, was a national level figure skating competition for American skaters at the juvenile and intermediate levels. 

The first such event, originally called Junior Olympics, was held in the mid 1990s. Singles freestyle competitors qualified at the regional level while pairs and ice dancers qualified at the sectional level.
Juvenile and intermediate levels competed at the JFS Championships until 2012.
Beginning in 2013, all levels compete at the U.S. Figure Skating Championships.

Juvenile medalists

Boys

Girls

Pairs

Ice dance

Open juvenile medalists

Pairs

Ice dance

Intermediate medalists

Men

Ladies

Pairs

Ice dance

Notes

References 
 1999 U.S. Junior Olympics Results
 2000 U.S. Junior Figure Skating Championship Results
 2001 U.S. Junior Figure Skating Championship Results
 2002 U.S. Junior Figure Skating Championship Results
 2003 U.S. Junior Figure Skating Championship Results
 2004 U.S. Junior Figure Skating Championship Results
 2005 U.S. Junior Figure Skating Championship Results
 2006 U.S. Junior Figure Skating Championship Results
 2007 U.S. Junior Figure Skating Championship Results
 2008 U.S. Junior Figure Skating Championship Results
 2009 U.S. Junior Figure Skating Championship Results
 2010 U.S. Junior Figure Skating Championship Results
 2011 U.S. Junior Figure Skating Championship Results
 2012 U.S. Junior Figure Skating Championship Results

External links 

 Triple Salchow propels Hiwatashi to win in short
Awards ceremonie photos from U.S Junior National Figure Skating Championships 2012
Projections 2012 U.S. Junior Championships
 2002 U.S Junior Nationals
 2012 U.S. Junior Figure Skating Championships Washington Figure Skating Club wishes all our skaters the best of luck at U.S. Junior Nationals!
 Utah girl takes 4th at junior nationals
 Yorktown native shines at U.S. Junior Figure Skating Championships

Figure skating in the United States
Figure skating competitions
Figure skating national championships